Emmanuel Presbyterian Church, also known as Trinity Emmanuel Presbyterian Church, is a historic Presbyterian church located at Rochester in Monroe County, New York. It is an Arts and Crafts / American Craftsman style building constructed in 1914–1915.  The main, original two story block of the building is cruciform in plan with slightly longer arms at the north and south ends.

It was listed on the National Register of Historic Places in 2001.

Gallery

References

External links
 Trinity Emmanuel Presbyterian Church

Churches on the National Register of Historic Places in New York (state)
Presbyterian churches in New York (state)
American Craftsman architecture in New York (state)
Churches completed in 1915
20th-century Presbyterian church buildings in the United States
Churches in Rochester, New York
National Register of Historic Places in Rochester, New York